A Mile in My Shoes is a 2016 Moroccan drama film directed by Said Khallaf. It was selected as the Moroccan entry for the Best Foreign Language Film at the 89th Academy Awards but it was not nominated.

See also
 List of submissions to the 89th Academy Awards for Best Foreign Language Film
 List of Moroccan submissions for the Academy Award for Best Foreign Language Film

References

External links

2016 films
2016 drama films
Moroccan drama films
2010s Arabic-language films
2010s French-language films
2016 multilingual films
Moroccan multilingual films